Faig Azizov (born 4 November 1966) is a retired  Azerbaijani footballer who played as a goalkeeper.

Honours
 Inşaatçı
 Azerbaijan Cup
 Winner (1): 1992

References

1966 births
Living people
Association football goalkeepers
Azerbaijani footballers
Azerbaijani expatriate footballers
Expatriate footballers in Iran
Machine Sazi F.C. players
Footballers from Baku